Eva Lang (born January 10, 1947 in Stuttgart) is a German economist. Before her retirement, she was full professor at Bundeswehr University Munich for economic policy in special consideration of political economy.

Vita 
Lang studied economics and political science and obtained her doctorate and habilitation on the topics of infrastructure, business cycle theory and public finance. After an assistantship at University of Würzburg, she was appointed to a professorship at Fachhochschule Westküste in Heide, Germany. Starting in 1996, she was professor at Bundeswehr University Munich. She is founder member and since 2014 anew president of the steering committee of Vereinigung für Ökologische Ökonomie (VÖÖ), a German partner organisation of International Society for Ecological Economics. She is member of the board of trustees of Bürgerstiftung München, a civic society in Munich.

Her academic focus is ecological economics, sustainable social and budgetary policy, precautionary economics and eco-social modernization.

Literatur 
 (Zugleich Dissertation der Wirtschafts- und Sozialwissenschaftlichen Fakultät der Universität Würzburg)

 
 
 
  (online, PDF, 860 kB)

References

External links 

1947 births
Living people
20th-century German  economists
21st-century  German economists
Ecological economists
Environmental economists
Academic staff of Bundeswehr University Munich